The following is a list of all current judges of the United States courts of appeals. The United States courts of appeals or circuit courts are the intermediate appellate courts of the United States federal court system. The list includes both "active" and "senior" judges, both of whom hear and decide cases.

Of the thirteen US courts of appeals, twelve are divided into geographical jurisdictions. Of those twelve, eleven are designated numerically, while the other is the District of Columbia Circuit. The thirteenth is the United States Court of Appeals for the Federal Circuit which has nationwide jurisdiction over appeals of certain, specific subject matter, for example patent law.

Congress has currently authorized 179 judgeships, though the number of "current" judges will be higher than 179 because of some judges electing senior status. Only active, non-senior-status judges may fill one of the 179 authorized judgeships. As of June 14, 2022 there are eleven nominations awaiting Senate action along with four vacancies and nine more announced retirements for which there are no nominations yet.

Per the practice of visiting judges, sometimes appeals courts cases are heard and decided by active, senior, or retired judges from the US district courts, US courts of appeals, or US Supreme Court, for cases  either within or outside of their assigned geographical jurisdiction. While some judges with senior status are currently inactive, these judges are not yet retired and may return to actively hearing cases at any time.

Current judges of the First Circuit

Current judges of the Second Circuit

Current judges of the Third Circuit

Current judges of the Fourth Circuit

Current judges of the Fifth Circuit

Current judges of the Sixth Circuit

Current judges of the Seventh Circuit

Current judges of the Eighth Circuit

Current judges of the Ninth Circuit

Current judges of the Tenth Circuit

Current judges of the Eleventh Circuit

Current judges of the District of Columbia Circuit

Current judges of the Federal Circuit

See also
 List of current United States district judges

References 

circuit judges